The Sani people (撒尼人) are a branch of the Yi people in China and speak the Sani language a dialect of the Yi language. The Sani people live mainly in the central part of Yunnan, notably Shílín (formerly Lùnán) and Yíliáng counties as well as in Lúxī County.

References

Ethnic groups in Yunnan
Yi people